The Nkwe ya Boronse - Bronze Leopard, post-nominal letters NB, is a military decoration for bravery which was instituted in 2003. It is South Africa's third highest military decoration for bravery.

Institution
The Nkwe ya Boronse - Bronze Leopard, post-nominal letters NB, was instituted by the President of the Republic of South Africa on 16 April 2003 and came into effect on 27 April 2003. The bilingual title of the decoration is in Sepedi and English. It is the junior of a set of three military decorations for bravery, along with the Nkwe ya Gauta - Golden Leopard and the Nkwe ya Selefera - Silver Leopard.

Award criteria
The Nkwe ya Boronse can be awarded to all ranks of the South African National Defence Force and of any Auxiliary Service of the SANDF, and of any Armed Forces attached to or serving with or rendering any service to the SANDF, who have distinguished themselves by performing acts of bravery on a single occasion or over a period of time during military operations, or for exceptional combat leadership.

A Bar may be awarded for every subsequent action which would make recipients eligible for the award of the same decoration. The decoration and Bar may be awarded posthumously.

Guidelines, consisting of appropriate phrases which may be useful when writing a citation for the award of the Nkwe ya Boronse - Bronze Leopard, have been published by the South African Defence Department. The exceptional combat leadership criteria were apparently added after the Battle of Bangui in the Central African Republic from 22 to 24 March 2013.

For acts of bravery
 Distinguished conduct.
 Distinguished above others.
 Incident or different incidents.
 Sustained high performance.
 More than normal.
 Positive conduct sheet.
 Creative.
 Initiative.

For exceptional combat leadership
 Incidents or deeds depicting outstanding leadership qualities.
 Result of operation in favour of the SANDF.
 Create trust amongst fellow soldiers.
 Places a high premium on the prevention of the loss of lives.
 Careful execution of the operational plan.

Order of wear

The position of the Nkwe ya Boronse - Bronze Leopard in the official military and national orders of precedence is as follows:

  
Official military order of precedence
 Preceded by the Distinguished Gallantry Medal of the Republic of Bophuthatswana.
 Succeeded by the Ad Astra Decoration (AAD) of the Republic of South Africa.

Official national order of precedence
 Preceded by the Medal for Valour in the Prisons Service of the Republic of Bophuthatswana.
 Succeeded by the Mendi Decoration for Bravery, Bronze (MDB) of the Republic of South Africa.

Description
Obverse
The Nkwe ya Boronse - Bronze Leopard is a five-armed cross pattée, struck in bronze, with a diameter of 38 millimetres. The extremities of the arms of the cross are embowed, with their flat surfaces urdy and their corners concave, with each pair of arms of the cross separated by three short rays. In the centre of the obverse is a light blue enamel roundel, 19 millimetres in diameter, with a bronze leopard's head.

Reverse
The reverse bears, in relief, the Coat of arms of South Africa. The decoration is attached to a plain bronze suspender, fixed to the upper arm of the decoration. The medal number is stamped or engraved below the Coat of Arms.

Ribbon
The ribbon is 32 millimetres wide and sky blue, with 6 millimetres wide light brown edges. The blue represents the feathers of the blue crane, which Xhosa kings used to present to brave warriors.

Bar
The Bar for subsequent conferments of the Nkwe ya Boronse - Bronze Leopard is 33 millimetres in length and 5 millimetres high, struck in bronze and embossed in the centre with a replica of the decoration. When only a ribbon bar is worn, a button replica of the decoration, 8 millimetres in diameter and struck in bronze, is affixed to the ribbon bar.

Insignia
Award of the decoration for service in active military operations, is indicated by distinguishing insignia which indicate the arm of the service in which the recipient was serving at the time of the action for which the decoration was conferred. The insignia are struck in bronze and worn on the ribbon, above any bars which may have been awarded.
 Crossed swords for the South African Army.
 An eagle for the South African Air Force.
 An Anchor for the South African Navy.
 The Rod of Aesculapius for the South African Military Health Service.

Recipients
In respect of those recipients about whom it is available, the actions they were cited for follow below the table, since inclusion in the table itself is impractical.

Note 1:  denotes a posthumous award.

Actions cited for

References

Military decorations and medals of South Africa
Courage awards
2003 establishments in South Africa
Awards established in 2003